Ivey and Crook was an architectural firm active in Atlanta from the 1920s to 1960s. Works include:
 Rhodes Center (1937, Atlanta's first shopping center) and the Crum & Forster Building, both in Midtown Atlanta
 the Lenox Park (Atlanta) subdivision
 Druid Hills Methodist Church
 Lullwater House and the Candler Library at Emory University
Olympia Building at Five Points
 Sigma Alpha Epsilon fraternity at Georgia Institute of Technology

Ernest Daniel Ivey and Lewis Crook were both Georgia Tech graduates who helped establish the Architecture program at Georgia Tech in 1908.

References

External links
 New Georgia Encyclopedia

Architecture firms based in Georgia (U.S. state)
Companies based in Atlanta